Yashar may refer to:

People

Given name
Yashar Ali (born 1979), American journalist and lobbyist
Yashar Aliyev (diplomat) (born 1955), Azerbaijani diplomat and United Nations official
Yashar Aliyev (wrestler) (born ?), Azerbaijani freestyle wrestler
Yashar Hasanov (born ?), Azerbaijani military officer
Yashar Kemal (1923–2015), Turkish Kurdish novelist and human rights activist 
Yashar Nuri (1951–2012), Azerbaijani actor
Yashar Soltani (born ?), Iranian journalist, editor, and anti-corruption activist
Yashar Vahabzade (born 1960), Azerbaijani footballer
Yashar Zadeh ( Yak Ballz; born 1982), American hip hop artist

Surname
Deborah J. Yashar (born 1963), American political scientist and journal editor
Dzhuneyt Yashar (born 1985), Bulgarian footballer
Gisele Yashar, fictional character portrayed by Gal Gadot in The Fast and The Furious film franchise

Places
Qerkh Yashar, a village in northwestern Iran
Yashar Mammadzade Stadium, a sporting venue in Azerbaijan

Other uses
Yashar (song), a 1983 single by Cabaret Voltaire
Yashar Books, a Jewish Orthodox publishing house owned and operated by Gil Student
Yashar LaChayal, an Israeli non-profit organization

See also

Yaşar (disambiguation)
Yasar (disambiguation)
Yasha (disambiguation)
Kav ha-Yashar, a 1705 book of musar literature by Rabbi Tzvi Hirsch Kaidanover
Sefer haYashar (disambiguation)